"I Do Too" is a song co-written and recorded by Canadian country music duo the Reklaws. The duo wrote the song with Brad Rempel of High Valley and Ben Stennis. It was the fourth single off their second studio album Freshman Year.

Critical reception
"I Do Too" was named Top Country Pick of the Week for June 11, 2019. They stated that the song "illustrates the struggle of self-doubt, even when your dreams are coming true", calling it an "important message".

Commercial performance
"I Do Too" reached a peak of number 6 on the Billboard Canada Country chart dated August 17, 2019. It also peaked at #98 on Canadian Hot 100 in the same week. It was certified Gold by Music Canada.

Credits and personnel
Credits adapted from Freshman Year CD booklet.

Todd Clark — production, engineering, programming, backing vocals, guitar, keyboard
Andrew Mendelson — mastering
Sean Moffitt — mixing
Mike Waldron — guitar, banjo
Jenna Walker — lead vocals
Stuart Walker — lead vocals
Derek Wells — guitar

Charts

Certifications

References

2019 songs
2019 singles
The Reklaws songs
Universal Music Canada singles
Songs written by Brad Rempel
Songs written by Ben Stennis 
Songs written by Jenna Walker
Songs written by Stuart Walker (singer)
Song recordings produced by Todd Clark